Tsuklakhang Palace or Tsuklakhang Royal Chapel and Monastery is a Buddhist palatial monastery in Gangtok, Sikkim, India.

The Royal Chapel of the Chogyals is the main centre for prayers with an assembly hall in the centre and large depository of Buddhist scriptures and literature and contains altars which are orated with Buddha, Bodhisattvas and Tantric deities. Tsukhalang Palace which served as a location for coronation, marriages and victory ceremonies among the Sikkimese royalty.

The palace celebrates Pang Lhabsol, held in mid September in honor of Mount Khangchendzonga, and Kagyad is celebrated in early December.

Gallery

References

Buddhist monasteries in Sikkim
Gangtok
Palaces in Sikkim